

Downham Rural District was a rural district in Norfolk, England from 1894 to 1974.

It was formed under the Local Government Act 1894 based on the Downham rural sanitary district.  It completely encircled Downham Market Urban District.

In 1930 a new parish of Nordelph was created in Downham RD, taking land mostly out of the Marshland RD parish of Upwell.
 
Several changes were made to its boundaries in 1935. In particular, it took in four large (in area terms) parishes from the disbanded Thetford Rural District.

In 1974, the district was abolished under the Local Government Act 1972, and became part of the West Norfolk district, renamed King's Lynn and West Norfolk in 1981.

Welney Rural District
Welney Rural District was (at least nominally) a short-lived entity created in 1894 containing the only parish, West Welney, which had been in Downham RSD but lay in the Isle of Ely rather than Norfolk. Its population at the time was about 500. In 1895 the parish was transferred to Norfolk, and Welney RD was absorbed by Downham RD. There does not appear to be any evidence that it ever actually functioned.

Statistics

Parishes

References

Districts of England created by the Local Government Act 1894
Districts of England abolished by the Local Government Act 1972
Historical districts of Norfolk
Rural districts of England